By-elections to the 32nd Canadian Parliament were held to fill vacancies in the House of Commons of Canada between the 1980 federal election and the 1984 federal election. The Liberal Party of Canada led a majority government for the entirety of the 32nd Canadian Parliament, though their number did decrease from by-elections.

27 seats became vacant during the life of the Parliament. 12 of these vacancies were filled through by-elections, and 15 seats remained vacant when the 1984 federal election was called.

See also
List of federal by-elections in Canada

Sources
 Parliament of Canada–Elected in By-Elections 

1983 elections in Canada
1982 elections in Canada
1981 elections in Canada
1980 elections in Canada
32nd